General elections were held in Saint Kitts-Nevis-Anguilla on 1 December 1975. The result was a victory for the Saint Kitts-Nevis-Anguilla Labour Party, which won seven of the nine seats.

Results

References

Saint Kitts
Elections in Saint Kitts and Nevis
1975 in Saint Kitts-Nevis-Anguilla
Elections in Anguilla
December 1975 events in North America
Saint Kitts